Drosophantis is a genus of moths of the family Crambidae. It contains only one species, Drosophantis caeruleata, which is found from India and Sri Lanka east to Taiwan, Thailand, Sumbawa and Australia (Robinson et al., 1994)

References

Musotiminae
Crambidae genera
Taxa named by Edward Meyrick